Aaha  is a 2021 Malayalam-language sports drama film directed by Bibin Paul Samuel. Produced by Prem Abraham under the banner Zsa Zsa Productions, Aaha marks Bibin's directorial debut. Starring Indrajith Sukumaran in the lead, also featuring Ashwin Kumar, Manoj K. Jayan, Amith Chakalakkal and Santhy Balachandran

Tobit Chirayath has scripted the film. The film is produced by Prem Abraham under the banner Zsa Zsa Productions and the music composed by Sayanora Philip and Shiyad Kabeer.

Premise
The film is inspired from a very popular tug of war team of the 80s and 90s - 'Aaha Neeloor', who were on the top of their game for about 15 years. The story revolves around rustic characters who do manual work such as rubber tapping and catering in the day. In the night, however, these people are superstars because of the tug of war games.

Cast
Indrajith Sukumaran as Kochu
Manoj K. Jayan as Geevarghese  / Geevichan Aashan
Amith Chakalakkal as Ani
Ashwin Kumar  as Chenkan
Santhy Balachandran as Mary
Jayashankar Karimuttam
Sidhartha Siva
 Arun Kumar Pavumba as Jaison
Solomon Sangchoju as Binayak
Anup Pandalam
Nitin Thomas as Pakkan Biju
Vidhya Vijayakumar as Anu
Megha Thomas as Grace
Shiva Raaj as Polla
Aswathlal as Siju
Akhil Manoj as Sreenath

Production
The principal photography of the film began 2019 and completed in 62 days in over 84 locations, about 160 crew members and around 6000 artists. The filming was completed in January 2020.

Music
The songs were composed by Sayanora Philip for the lyrics written by herself and Jubith Naradath.

Release
Aaha was scheduled to release on 4 June 2021, but was postponed due to COVID-19 pandemic in India. On 12 November 2021, the makers officially announced that it will be released on 19 November 2021.

Filmmakers have indicated their desire to release the film theatrically despite the delay due to COVID-19 shutdowns, in lieu of releasing to an OTT platform.

References

External links
 

2021 films
Indian sports films
2020s Malayalam-language films